T'ula Qullu (Aymara t'ula wood, burning material, qullu mountain, "wood mountain", also spelled Thola Khollu, Thola Kkollu) or Suri Qullu (Aymara suri rhea, "rhea mountain", also spelled Zuricollo) is a  mountain in the Andes of Bolivia. It is situated in the La Paz Department, José Manuel Pando Province, Catacora Municipality, T'ula Qullu Canton. T'ula Qullu lies near the border to Peru, between the Peruvian mountain Chila  in the west and Sinijawi  in the east, northwest of the Sirk'i volcano.

See also 
 Parina Quta

References 

Mountains of La Paz Department (Bolivia)